Grzegorz Szczepanik (born 10 June 1953) is a Polish former motorcycle speedway rider who rode in the British League for Leicester Lions.

Born in Rybnik, Szczepanik first rode in Poland in 1973 for the ROW Rybnik club. After finishing eleventh in the Polish Junior Championship in 1974 he signed for Leicester Lions in 1976, but after a season where he averaged below three points per match, he returned to Poland.

References

1953 births
Living people
Polish speedway riders
Leicester Lions riders
People from Rybnik
Sportspeople from Silesian Voivodeship